This is a list of Allied warships that served at the Battle of Gallipoli in 1915.

Royal Navy warships 
All British warships which served in the Dardanelles region received the battle honour Dardanelles 1915 after the war

 Seaplane carriers
 
 
 Battleships
 
 Battlecruisers
 
 
  (mined and damaged on March 18)
Pre-dreadnought battleships
 
 
 
 
 
 
  (torpedoed and sunk on May 13 at Cape Helles, 570 men killed)
 
 
  (mined and sunk on March 18, 150 men killed)
 
 
 
  (torpedoed and sunk on May 27 at Cape Helles, 49 men killed)
 
  (mined and sunk on March 18, little loss of life)
 
 
 
 
 
  (torpedoed and sunk on May 25 at Anzac, 78 men killed)
 
 
 Zealandia
 Cruisers
 
 
 
 
 
 
 
 
 
 
 
 
 
 
 
 
 
 
 
 Destroyers
 
 
 
 
 
 
 
 
 
 
 
  (ran aground during a gale and destroyed by shellfire on October 31)
 
 
 
 
 
 
 
 
 
 
 
 
 
 
 
 
 Monitors
 
 
 
 
 
 
 
 
 Sloops
 Anemone
 Aster
 
 
  (HQ for British IX Corps at Suvla)
 Submarines
 
 
 
  (scuttled on September 5)
 
 
  (destroyed on April 19)
  (torpedoed and sunk on November 5)
 Other
 (Trawler / minesweeper)
  (Kite balloon ship)
 Egmont (Ironclad, formerly )
  (Hospital ship)
  (Kite balloon ship)
  (Armed Boarding Steamer)
  (Kite balloon ship)
  (Yacht)
Barryfield (paddle steamer converted to landing vessel)http://historicalrfa.org/requisitioned-auxiliaries/161-requisitioned-auxiliaries-b/1575-requisitioned-auxiliary-barry

French warships 
 Battleships
  (mined and sunk on March 18, 1915, 660 men killed)
 
 
 
 
  (hulk scuttled off Cape Helles in November 1915)
 
 
 Cruisers
 
 
 Submarines
 
  (mined and sunk on May 1, 31 men killed)
  (scuttled on July 27)
  (sunk on January 15, 1915, 15 men killed)
  (captured on October 30)

Other warships 
  - Russian light cruiser
  - Australian submarine (attacked, later scuttled on April 29)

References

Gallipoli campaign
Gallipoli